The German Confederation was an association of 39 predominantly German-speaking sovereign states in Central Europe. It was created by the Congress of Vienna in 1815 as a replacement of the former Holy Roman Empire, which had been dissolved in 1806.

The Confederation had only one organ, the Federal Convention (also Federal Assembly or Confederate Diet). The Convention consisted of the representatives of the member states. The most important issues had to be decided on unanimously. The Convention was presided over by the representative of Austria. This was a formality, however, as the Confederation did not have a head of state, since it was not a state.

The Confederation, on the one hand, was a strong alliance between its member states because federal law was superior to state law (the decisions of the Federal Convention were binding for the member states). Additionally, the Confederation had been established for eternity and was impossible to dissolve (legally), with no member states being able to leave it and no new member being able join without universal consent in the Federal Convention. On the other hand, the Confederation was weakened by its very structure and member states, partly because most important decisions in the Federal Convention required unanimity and the purpose of the Confederation was limited to only security matters. On top of that, the functioning of the Confederation depended on the cooperation of the two most populous member states, Austria and Prussia which in reality were often in opposition.

The German revolutions of 1848–1849, motivated by liberal, democratic, socialist, and nationalist sentiments, attempted to transform the Confederation into a unified German federal state with a liberal constitution (usually called the Frankfurt Constitution in English). The Federal Convention was dissolved on 12 July 1848, but was re-established in 1850 after the revolution was crushed by Austria, Prussia, and other states.

The Confederation was finally dissolved after the victory of the Kingdom of Prussia in the Seven Weeks' War over the Austrian Empire in 1866. The dispute over which had the inherent right to rule German lands ended in favour of Prussia, leading to the creation of the North German Confederation under Prussian leadership in 1867, to which the eastern portions of the Kingdom of Prussia were added. A number of South German states remained independent until they joined the North German Confederation, which was renamed and proclaimed as the "German Empire" in 1871, as the unified Germany (aside from Austria) with the Prussian king as emperor (Kaiser) after the victory over French Emperor Napoleon III in the Franco-Prussian War of 1870.

Most historians have judged the Confederation to have been weak and ineffective, as well as an obstacle to the creation of a German nation-state. This weakness was part of its design, as the European Great Powers, including Prussia and especially Austria, did not want it to become a nation-state. However, the Confederation was not a 'loose' tie between the German states, as it was impossible to leave the Confederation, and as Confederation law stood above the law of the aligned states. The constitutional weakness of the Confederation lay in the principle of unanimity in the Diet and the limits of the Confederation's scope: it was essentially a military alliance to defend Germany against external attacks and internal riots. Ironically, the War of 1866 proved its ineffectiveness, as it was unable to combine the federal troops in order to fight the Prussian secession.

History

Background

The War of the Third Coalition lasted from about 1803 to 1806. The resulting Treaty of  established the Confederation of the Rhine in July 1806, joining sixteen of France's allies among the German states (including Bavaria and ). Only Austria, Prussia, Danish , Swedish Pomerania, and the French-occupied Principality of Erfurt stayed outside the Confederation of the Rhine. The War of the Sixth Coalition from 1812 to winter 1814 saw the defeat of Napoleon and the liberation of Germany. In June 1814, the famous German patriot Heinrich vom Stein created the Central Managing Authority for Germany (Zentralverwaltungsbehörde) in Frankfurt to replace the defunct Confederation of the Rhine. However, plenipotentiaries gathered at the Congress of Vienna were determined to create a weaker union of German states than envisaged by Stein.

Establishment
The German Confederation was created by the 9th Act of the Congress of Vienna on 8 June 1815 after being alluded to in Article 6 of the 1814 Treaty of Paris, ending the War of the Sixth Coalition.

The Confederation was formally created by a second treaty, the Final Act of the Ministerial Conference to Complete and Consolidate the Organization of the German Confederation. This treaty was not concluded and signed by the parties until 15 May 1820. States joined the German Confederation by becoming parties to the second treaty. The states designated for inclusion in the Confederation were:

In 1867 the duchy was declared to be an "integral part of the Kingdom of the Netherlands". The cities of Maastricht and Venlo were not included in the Confederation.

The Austrian Empire and the Kingdom of Prussia were the largest and by far the most powerful members of the Confederation. Large parts of both countries were not included in the Confederation, because they had not been part of the former Holy Roman Empire, nor were the greater parts of their armed forces been incorporated in the federal army. Austria and Prussia each had one vote in the Federal Assembly.

Three foreign monarchs ruled member states: the King of Denmark as Duke of Holstein and Duke of Saxe-Lauenburg; the King of the Netherlands as Grand Duke of Luxembourg and (from 1839) Duke of Limburg; and the King of the United Kingdom (until 1837) as King of Hanover were members of the German Confederation. Each of them had a vote in the Federal Assembly. At its foundation in 1815, four member states were ruled by foreign monarchs, as the King of Denmark was Duke of both Holstein and Saxe-Lauenburg.

The 23 remaining states (at its formation in 1815) shared five votes in the Federal Assembly:

 Saxe-Weimar, Saxe-Meiningen, Saxe-Gotha-Altenburg, Saxe-Coburg-Saalfeld and Saxe-Hildburghausen (5 states)
 Brunswick and Nassau (2 states)
 Mecklenburg-Schwerin and Mecklenburg-Strelitz (2 states)
 Oldenburg, Anhalt-Dessau, Anhalt-Bernburg, Anhalt-Köthen, Schwarzburg-Rudolstadt and Schwarzburg-Sondershausen (6 states)
 Hohenzollern-Hechingen, Hohenzollern-Sigmaringen, Liechtenstein, Reuss (Elder Branch), Reuss (Younger Branch), Schaumburg-Lippe, Lippe and Waldeck (8 states)

There were therefore 17 votes in the Federal Assembly.

Military

Activities 
The rules of the Confederation provided for three different types of military interventions:
 the federal war (Bundeskrieg) against an external enemy who attacks federal territory,
 the federal execution (Bundesexekution) against the government of a member state that violates federal law,
 the federal intervention (Bundesintervention) supporting a government that is under pressure of a popular uprising.
Other military conflicts were foreign to the confederation (bundesfremd). An example is Austria's oppression of the uprising in Northern Italy in 1848 and 1849, as these Austrian territories lay outside of the confederation's borders.

During the existence of the Confederation, there was only one federal war: the war against Denmark beginning with the Schleswig-Holstein uprising in 1848 (the First Schleswig War). The conflict became a federal war when the Bundestag demanded from Denmark to withdraw its troops from Schleswig (April 12th) and recognized the revolutionary of Schleswig-Holstein (April 22th). The confederation was transformed into the German Empire of 1848. Prussia was de facto the most important member state conducting the war for Germany.

There are several examples for federal executions and especially federal interventions. In 1863, the Confederation ordered a federal execution against the duke of Holstein (the Danish king). Federal troops occupied Holstein which was a member state. After this, Austria and Prussia declared war on Denmark, the Second Schleswig War (or Deutsch-Dänischer Krieg in German). As Schleswig and Denmark were no member states, this war was foreign to the Confederation. The Confederation took no part in this war.

A federal intervention confronted for example the raid of the revolutionaries in Baden in April 1848.

In June 1866, the Federal Convention decided to takes measures against Prussia. This decision was technically not a federal execution for a lack of time to observe the actual procedure. Prussia had violated, according to the majority of the convention, federal law by sending its troops to Holstein. The decision led to the war in summer 1866 that ended with the dissolution of the confederation (known as Seven Weeks War or by other names).

Armed forces
The German Federal Army (Deutsches Bundesheer) was supposed to collectively defend the German Confederation from external enemies, primarily France. Successive laws passed by the Confederate Diet set the form and function of the army, as well as contribution limits of the member states. The Diet had the power to declare war and was responsible for appointing a supreme commander of the army and commanders of the individual army corps. This made mobilization extremely slow and added a political dimension to the army. In addition, the Diet oversaw the construction and maintenance of several German Federal Fortresses and collected funds annually from the member states for this purpose.

Projections of army strength were published in 1835, but the work of forming the Army Corps did not commence until 1840 as a consequence of the Rhine Crisis. Money for the fortresses were determined by an act of the Confederate Diet in that year. By 1846, Luxemburg still had not formed its own contingent, and Prussia was rebuffed for offering to supply 1,450 men to garrison the Luxemburg fortress that should have been supplied by Waldeck and the two Lippes. In that same year, it was decided that a common symbol for the Federal Army should be the old Imperial two-headed eagle, but without crown, scepter, or sword, as any of those devices encroached on the individual sovereignty of the states. King Frederick William IV of Prussia was among those who derided the "disarmed imperial eagle" as a national symbol.

The German Federal Army was divided into ten Army Corps (later expanded to include a Reserve Corps). However, the Army Corps were not exclusive to the German Confederation but composed from the national armies of the member states, and did not include all of the armed forces of a state. For example, Prussia's army consisted of nine Army Corps but contributed only three to the German Federal Army.

The strength of the mobilized German Federal Army was projected to total 303,484 men in 1835 and 391,634 men in 1860, with the individual states providing the following figures:

 Notes

Situation in history
Between 1806 and 1815, Napoleon organized the German states, aside from Prussia and Austria, into the Confederation of the Rhine, but this collapsed after his defeats in 1812 to 1815. The German Confederation had roughly the same boundaries as the Empire at the time of the French Revolution (less what is now Belgium). It also kept intact most of Confederation's reconstituted member states and their boundaries. The member states, drastically reduced to 39 from more than 300 (see ) under the Holy Roman Empire, were recognized as fully sovereign.

The only organ of the Confederation was the Federal Assembly (officially , often called ), which consisted of the delegates of the states' governments. There was no head of state, but the Austrian delegate presided over the Assembly (according to the Bundesakte). The Assembly met in Frankfurt.

The Confederation was enabled to accept and deploy ambassadors. It allowed ambassadors of the European powers to the Assembly, but rarely deployed ambassadors itself.

During the revolution of 1848/49 the Federal Assembly was inactive. After crushing the revolution and illegally disbanding the National Assembly, the Prussian King failed to create a German nation state by himself. The Federal Assembly was revived in 1850 on Austrian initiative, but only fully reinstalled in the Summer of 1851.

Rivalry between Prussia and Austria grew more and more, especially after 1859. The Confederation was dissolved in 1866 after the Austro-Prussian War, and was succeeded in 1866 by the Prussian-dominated North German Confederation. Unlike the German Confederation, the North German Confederation was in fact a true state.

Impact of the French Revolution and the Napoleonic invasions

The late 18th century was a period of political, economic, intellectual, and cultural reforms, the Enlightenment (represented by figures such as Locke, and Adam Smith), but also involving early Romanticism, and climaxing with the French Revolution, where freedom of the individual and nation was asserted against privilege and custom.  Representing a great variety of types and theories, they were largely a response to the disintegration of previous cultural patterns, coupled with new patterns of production, specifically the rise of industrial capitalism.

However, the defeat of Napoleon enabled conservative and reactionary regimes such as those of the Kingdom of Prussia, the Austrian Empire, and Tsarist Russia to survive, laying the groundwork for the Congress of Vienna and the alliance that strove to oppose radical demands for change ushered in by the French Revolution. With Austria's position on the continent now intact and ostensibly secure under its reactionary premier , the Habsburg empire would serve as a barrier to contain the emergence of Italian and German nation-states as well, in addition to containing France.  But this reactionary balance of power, aimed at blocking German and Italian nationalism on the continent, was precarious.

After Napoleon's final defeat in 1815, the surviving member states of the defunct Holy Roman Empire joined to form the German Confederation—a rather loose organization, especially because the two great rivals, the Austrian Empire and the Kingdom of Prussia, each feared domination by the other.

In Prussia the  rulers forged a centralized state. By the time of the Napoleonic Wars, Prussia, grounded in the virtues of its established military aristocracy (the ) and stratified by rigid hierarchical lines, had been surpassed militarily and economically by France. After 1807, Prussia's defeats by Napoleonic France highlighted the need for administrative, economic, and social reforms to improve the efficiency of the bureaucracy and encourage practical merit-based education.

Outside Prussia, industrialization progressed slowly, and was held back because of political disunity, conflicts of interest between the nobility and merchants, and the continued existence of the guild system, which discouraged competition and innovation. While this kept the middle class at bay, affording the old order a measure of stability not seen in France, Prussia's vulnerability to Napoleon's military proved to many among the old order that a fragile, divided, and traditionalist Germany would be easy prey for its cohesive and industrializing neighbor.

The reforms laid the foundation for Prussia's future military might by professionalizing the military and decreeing universal military conscription. In order to industrialize Prussia, working within the framework provided by the old aristocratic institutions, land reforms were enacted to break the monopoly of the s on land ownership, thereby also abolishing, among other things, the feudal practice of serfdom.

Romanticism, nationalism, and liberalism in the  era
Although the forces unleashed by the French Revolution were seemingly under control after the Vienna Congress, the conflict between conservative forces and liberal nationalists was only deferred at best.

This conflict pitted the forces of the old order against those inspired by the French Revolution and the Rights of Man.  The breakdown of the competition was, roughly, the emerging capitalist bourgeoisie and petit-bourgeoisie (engaged mostly in commerce, trade, and industry), and the growing (and increasingly radicalized) industrial working class; and the other side associated with landowning aristocracy or military aristocracy (the s) in Prussia, the Habsburg monarchy in Austria, and the conservative notables of the small princely states and city-states in Germany.

Meanwhile, demands for change from below had been fomenting due to the influence of the French Revolution.  Throughout the German Confederation, Austrian influence was paramount, drawing the ire of the nationalist movements.   considered nationalism, especially the nationalist youth movement, the most pressing danger: German nationalism might not only repudiate Austrian dominance of the Confederation, but also stimulate nationalist sentiment within the Austrian Empire itself.  In a multi-national polyglot state in which Slavs and Magyars outnumbered the Germans, the prospects of Czech, Slovak, Hungarian, Polish, Serb, or Croatian sentiment along with middle class liberalism was certainly horrifying to the monarchist landed aristocracy.

The Wartburg Festival in 1817 celebrated Martin Luther as a proto-German nationalist, linking Lutheranism to German nationalism, and helping arouse religious sentiments for the cause of German nationhood. The festival culminated in the burning of several books and other items that symbolized reactionary attitudes. In 1819,  was accused of spying for Russia, and then murdered by a theological student, who was executed for the crime.

High culture

German artists and intellectuals, heavily influenced by the French Revolution, turned to Romanticism. At the universities, high-powered professors developed international reputations, especially in the humanities led by history and philology, which brought a new historical perspective to the study of political history, theology, philosophy, language, and literature. , for example, professionalized history and set the world standard for historiography. Young intellectuals often turned to politics, but their support for the failed Revolution of 1848 forced many into exile.

Population

Demographic transition
The population of the German Confederation (excluding Austria) grew 60% from 1815 to 1865, from 21,000,000 to 34,000,000. The era saw the demographic transition take place in Germany. It was a transition from high birth rates and high death rates to low birth and death rates as the country developed from a pre-industrial to a modernized agriculture and supported a fast-growing industrialized urban economic system. In previous centuries, the shortage of land meant that not everyone could marry, and marriages took place after age 25. The high birthrate was offset by a very high rate of infant mortality, plus periodic epidemics and harvest failures. After 1815, increased agricultural productivity meant a larger food supply, and a decline in famines, epidemics, and malnutrition. This allowed couples to marry earlier, and have more children. Arranged marriages became uncommon as young people were now allowed to choose their own marriage partners, subject to a veto by the parents. The upper and middle classes began to practice birth control, and a little later so too did the peasants. The population in 1800 was heavily rural, with only 8% of the people living in communities of 5,000 to 100,000 and another 2% living in cities of more than 100,000.

Nobility
In a heavily agrarian society, land ownership played a central role. Germany's nobles, especially those in the East called , dominated not only the localities, but also the Prussian court, and especially the Prussian army.  Increasingly after 1815, a centralized Prussian government based in Berlin took over the powers of the nobles, which in terms of control over the peasantry had been almost absolute.  They retained control of the judicial system on their estates until 1848, as well as control of hunting and game laws.  They paid no land tax until 1861 and kept their police authority until 1872, and controlled church affairs into the early 20th century.  To help the nobility avoid indebtedness, Berlin set up a credit institution to provide capital loans in 1809, and extended the loan network to peasants in 1849.  When the German Empire was established in 1871, the nobility controlled the army and the Navy, the bureaucracy, and the royal court; they generally set governmental policies.

Peasantry
Peasants continued to center their lives in the village, where they were members of a corporate body and helped manage community resources and monitor community life. In the East, they were serfs who were bound prominently to parcels of land. In most of Germany, farming was handled by tenant farmers who paid rents and obligatory services to the landlord, who was typically a nobleman. Peasant leaders supervised the fields and ditches and grazing rights, maintained public order and morals, and supported a village court which handled minor offenses. Inside the family, the patriarch made all the decisions and tried to arrange advantageous marriages for his children. Much of the villages' communal life centered around church services and holy days. In Prussia, the peasants drew lots to choose conscripts required by the army. The noblemen handled external relationships and politics for the villages under their control, and were not typically involved in daily activities or decisions.

Rapidly growing cities
After 1815, the urban population grew rapidly, due primarily to the influx of young people from the rural areas. Berlin grew from 172,000 people in 1800 to 826,000 in 1870; Hamburg grew from 130,000 to 290,000; Munich from 40,000 to 269,000;  (now ) from 60,000 to 208,000; Dresden from 60,000 to 177,000;  (now Kaliningrad) from 55,000 to 112,000.  Offsetting this growth, there was extensive emigration, especially to the United States.  Emigration totaled 480,000 in the 1840s, 1,200,000 in the 1850s, and 780,000 in the 1860s.

Ethnic minorities
Despite its name and intention, the German Confederation was not entirely populated by Germans; many people of other ethnic groups lived within its borders: 
 French-speaking Walloons lived in western Luxembourg prior to its division in 1839; 
 the Duchy of Limburg (a member between 1839 and 1866) had an entirely Dutch population; 
 Italians and Slovenians lived in south and southeast Austria; 
 Bohemia and Moravia, of the Lands of the Bohemian Crown were inhabited by a majority of Czechs; 
 Silesia had also a Polish and Czech inhabitants, while Sorbs were present in the parts of Saxony and the Prussian province of Brandenburg known as Lusatia
 Prussian part of the partitions of Poland was inhabited by a majority of Poles.

: economic integration

Historians have seen three Prussian goals: as a political tool to eliminate Austrian influence in Germany; as a way to improve the economies; and to strengthen Germany against potential French aggression while reducing the economic independence of smaller states.

Inadvertently, these reforms sparked the unification movement and augmented a middle class demanding further political rights, but at the time backwardness and Prussia's fears of its stronger neighbors were greater concerns.  The customs union opened up a common market, ended tariffs between states, and standardized weights, measures, and currencies within member states (excluding Austria), forming the basis of a proto-national economy.

By 1842 the  included most German states.  Within the next twenty years, the output of German furnaces increased fourfold.  Coal production grew rapidly as well.  In turn, German industry (especially the works established by the  family) introduced the steel gun, cast-steel axle, and a breech-loading rifle, exemplifying Germany's successful application of technology to weaponry.  Germany's security was greatly enhanced, leaving the Prussian state and the landowning aristocracy secure from outside threat. German manufacturers also produced heavily for the civilian sector.  No longer would Britain supply half of Germany's needs for manufactured goods, as it did beforehand. However, by developing a strong industrial base, the Prussian state strengthened the middle class and thus the nationalist movement. Economic integration, especially increased national consciousness among the German states, made political unity a far likelier scenario.  Germany finally began exhibiting all the features of a proto-nation.

The crucial factor enabling Prussia's conservative regime to survive the  era was a rough coalition between leading sectors of the landed upper class and the emerging commercial and manufacturing interests. Even if the commercial and industrial element is weak, it must be strong enough (or soon become strong enough) to become worthy of co-optation, and the French Revolution terrified enough perceptive elements of Prussia's s for the state to be sufficiently accommodating.

While relative stability was maintained until 1848, with enough bourgeois elements still content to exchange the "right to rule for the right to make money", the landed upper class found its economic base sinking. While the  brought economic progress and helped to keep the bourgeoisie at bay for a while, it increased the ranks of the middle class swiftly—the very social base for the nationalism and liberalism that the Prussian state sought to stem.

The  was a move toward economic integration, modern industrial capitalism, and the victory of centralism over localism, quickly bringing to an end the era of guilds in the small German princely states. This led to the 1844 revolt of the Silesian Weavers, who saw their livelihood destroyed by the flood of new manufactures.

The  also weakened Austrian domination of the Confederation as economic unity increased the desire for political unity and nationalism.

Revolutions of 1848

News of the 1848 Revolution in Paris quickly reached discontented bourgeois liberals, republicans and more radical working-men. Within a few days, there were revolutionary uprisings in other states including Austria, and finally in Prussia. King  of France fled to Great Britain.   gave in to the popular fury, and promised a constitution, a parliament, and support for German unification, safeguarding his own rule and regime.

On 18 May, the Frankfurt Parliament (Frankfurt Assembly) opened its first session, with delegates from various German states. The former favored offering the imperial crown to Prussia. The latter favored the Habsburg crown in Vienna, which would integrate Austria proper and Bohemia (but not Hungary) into the new Germany.

In May to August, the Assembly installed a provisional German Central Government, while conservatives swiftly moved against the reformers. As in Austria and Russia, this middle-class assertion increased authoritarian and reactionary sentiments among the landed upper class, whose economic position was declining. They turned to political levers to preserve their rule. As the Prussian army proved loyal, and the peasants were uninterested,  regained his confidence. As the monarchist forces marched their armies to crush rebellions in cities and towns throughout Austria and Germany the Frankfurt Assembly was forced to flee, first to Stuttgart and then to Württemberg, where, reduced to so few deputies that it could no longer form a quorum, its final meeting was forcibly dispersed on 18 June 1849 by the Württemberg army. With the complete triumph of monarchist reaction rampaging across all of Europe, thousands of German middle class liberals and "red" Forty-eighters were forced to flee into exile (primarily to the United States, the United Kingdom and Australia).

In 1849,  proposed his own constitution.  His document concentrated real power in the hands of the King and the upper classes, and called for a confederation of North German states—the Erfurt Union.  Austria and Russia, fearing a strong, Prussian-dominated Germany, responded by pressuring Saxony and Hanover to withdraw, and forced Prussia to abandon the scheme in a treaty dubbed the "humiliation of ".

Dissolution of the Confederation

Rise of Bismarck
A new generation of statesmen responded to popular demands for national unity for their own ends, continuing Prussia's tradition of autocracy and reform from above.  Germany found an able leader to accomplish the seemingly paradoxical task of conservative modernization. In 1851, Bismarck was appointed by King Wilhelm I of Prussia (the future Kaiser Wilhelm I) to circumvent the liberals in the Landtag of Prussia, who resisted Wilhelm's autocratic militarism. Bismarck told the Diet, "The great questions of the day are not decided by speeches and majority votes ... but by blood and iron" –  that is, by warfare and industrial might. Prussia already had a great army; it was now augmented by rapid growth of economic power.

Gradually, Bismarck subdued the more restive elements of the middle class with a combination of threats and reforms, reacting to the revolutionary sentiments expressed in 1848 by providing them with the economic opportunities for which the urban middle sectors had been fighting.

Seven Weeks' War
The German Confederation ended as a result of the Austro-Prussian War of 1866 between the Austrian Empire and its allies on one side and the Kingdom of Prussia and its allies on the other. The Confederation had 33 members immediately before its dissolution. In the Prague peace treaty, on 23 August 1866, Austria had to accept that the Confederation was dissolved. The following day, the remaining member states confirmed the dissolution. The treaty allowed Prussia to create a new  (a new kind of federation) in the North of Germany. The South German states were allowed to create a South German Confederation but this did not come into existence.

North German Confederation
Prussia created the North German Confederation in 1867, a federal state combining all German states north of the river Main and also the Hohenzollern territories in Swabia. Besides Austria, the South German states Bavaria, and Hesse- remained separate from the rest of Germany. However, due to the successful prosecution of the Franco-Prussian War, the four southern states joined the North German Confederation by treaties in November 1870.

German Empire
As the Franco-Prussian War drew to a close, King Ludwig II of Bavaria was persuaded to ask King Wilhelm to assume the crown of the new German Empire. On 1 January 1871, the Empire was declared by the presiding princes and generals in the Hall of Mirrors in the Palace of Versailles, near Paris. The Diet of the North German Confederation moved to rename the North German Confederation as the German Empire and gave the title of German Emperor to the King of Prussia. The new constitution of the state, the Constitution of the German Confederation, effectively transformed the Diet of the Confederation into the German Parliament (Reichstag).

Legacy 

The modern German nation state known as the Federal Republic is the continuation of the North German Confederation of 1867. This North German Confederation, a federal state, was a totally new creation: the law of the German Confederation ended, and new law came into existence. The German Confederation was, according to historian Kotulla, an association of states (Staatenbund) with some elements of a federal state (Bundesstaat), and the North German Confederation was a federal state with some elements of an association of states.

Still, the discussions and ideas of the period 1815-66 had a huge influence on the constitution of the North German Confederation. Most notably may be the Federal Council, the organ representing the member states. It is a certain copy of the 1815 Federal Convention of the German Confederation. The successor of that Federal Council of 1867 is the modern Bundesrat of the Federal Republic. 

The German Confederation does not play a very prominent role in German historiography and national culture. It is mainly seen negatively as an instrument to oppress the liberal, democratic and national movements of the period. On the contrary, the March revolution (1849/49) with its events and institutions attract much more attention and partially devotion. The most important memorial sites are the Paulskirche in Frankfurt, which is now a cultural hall of national importance, and the Rastatt castle with the Erinnerungsstätte für die Freiheitsbewegungen in der deutschen Geschichte (a museum and memorial site for the freedom movements in the German history, not only the March revolution).

The remnants of the federal fortifications are certain tourists attractions at least regionally or for people interested in military history.

Territorial legacy

The current countries whose territory were partly or entirely located inside the boundaries of the German Confederation 1815–1866 are:
 Germany (all states except Southern  in the north of )
 Austria (all states except )
 Luxembourg (entire territory)
 Liechtenstein (entire territory)
 Netherlands (Duchy of Limburg, was a member of the Confederation from 1839 till 1866)
 Czech Republic (entire territory)
 Poland (West Pomeranian Voivodship,  Voivodship, Lower Silesian Voivodship,  Voivodship, part of Silesia –  overwhelmingly German speaking at the time; East Prussia, West Prussia, and much of the Grand Duchy of Posen were admitted into the Confederation on 11 April 1848, but the terms of the restored Confederate Diet removed these territories on 30 May 1851)
 Belgium (nine of the eleven cantons of Eupen-Malmedy, Liège Province); the larger province of Luxembourg had left the Confederation at its accession to Belgium in 1839

Denmark proper has never been a member state, but its king was at the same time the duke of the member states Holstein and Lauenburg. The Duchy of Schleswig (which nowadays partially belongs to Denmark) was never a part of the Confederation although it was mentioned in the 1849 Frankfurt Constitution and governed briefly by a government installed by the German Central Government. However, Holstein, Lauenburg and Schleswig were combined under an Austrian-Prussian condominium in 1864–1866.

See also

 States of the German Confederation
 History of Germany
 German Empire
 North German Confederation
 Former countries in Europe after 1815
 Federal Convention
 Frankfurt Parliament

Notes

References

  (in German, detailed maps)

Further reading

 
 
 
 
 
 
 
 
 
 
 

 
History of Prussia
Modern history of Austria
Modern history of Germany
Pan-Germanism
19th century in Germany
19th century in Prussia
States and territories established in 1815
States and territories disestablished in 1848
States and territories established in 1850
States and territories disestablished in 1866
1815 establishments in Europe
.
.
.
1866 disestablishments in Europe
.
.